The Monastery of St. Varlaam is an Eastern Orthodox monastery that is part of the Meteora monastery complex in Thessaly, central Greece. It is situated at the top of a rocky precipice that is 373 metres above the valley floor.

The Dragon Cave is located to the south, below the monastery. To the east, the ruins of Kelarakia (Κελαράκια) Rock can be seen today. The Cell of St. Paul the Apostle can probably be identified with Kelarakia.

References

Varlaam